The Mehao wildlife sanctuary was declared with an aim to conserve the biodiversity around the Mehao Lake. The sanctuary is gifted with virgin natural lush green forest and lakes. The sancturary harbours some rare varieties of orchids. The altitude of the sanctuary varies from 900 to 3500 meters.

Flora
The forest can be classified into four major types; tropical evergreen, sub-tropical and temperate forest, temperate broad leaved forest and temperate coniferous forest. Plant species found in the sanctuary include Coptis teeta Taxus baccata, Terminalia myriocarpa, Terminalia bellirica, Terminalia chebula, Altingia excelsa, Jalauma phellocarpa, Abizzia lucida, Abizzia procera, Abizzia arunachalensis, Abizzia sherriffi, Acacia caesia, Canarium strictum, Lagerstroemia speciosa, Duabanga grandiflora, Michelia champaca, Messua ferra, Dillenia indica, Castanopsis indica, Bischofia javanica, Magnolia species, Ailanthus grandis, Kydia calycina, Bombax ceiba, Schima wallichii, Ficus altissima, Ainus nepalensis, Populus amblei, Castanopsis indica, Castanopsis spicata, Quercus griffithi, Quercus amellosa, and Betula alnoides.

Fauna
The Mehao Sanctuary is rich in biodiversity. The animals found in the sanctuary include tiger, leopard, clouded leopard, Asian elephant, gaur, sloth bear, barking deer, marbled cat, capped langur, slender loris, white browed gibbon, musk deer, Mishmi takin, red panda, and serow. The king cobra, python and great whip snake are the rare species of reptile found here. Butterflies include common peacock and Paris peacock.

Location
The sanctuary is 17 km from Roing town which is also the district headquarters. The best time to visit the sanctuary is from October to March.

References

Wildlife sanctuaries in Arunachal Pradesh
Tiger reserves of India
Tourism in Northeast India